Chitab (also Romanized as Chītāb) is a city in and the capital of Kabgian District, in Boyer-Ahmad County, Kohgiluyeh and Boyer-Ahmad Province, Iran. At the 2006 census, its population was 1,561, in 328 families.

References

Populated places in Boyer-Ahmad County

Cities in Kohgiluyeh and Boyer-Ahmad Province